Paramount Global (doing business as Paramount) is an American multinational mass media and entertainment conglomerate controlled by National Amusements (79.4%) and headquartered at One Astor Plaza in Midtown Manhattan, New York City. It was formed on December 4, 2019, as ViacomCBS Inc. through the merger of the second incarnations of CBS Corporation and Viacom (which were split from the original Viacom on December 31, 2005). The company changed its name to Paramount Global on February 16, 2022, the day after its Q4 earnings presentation.

Paramount's main properties include the namesake Paramount Pictures film and television studio, the CBS Entertainment Group (consisting of the CBS and The CW television networks, television stations, and other CBS-branded assets), media networks (consisting of U.S.-based cable television networks including MTV, Nickelodeon, BET, Comedy Central, VH1, CMT, Paramount Network and Showtime) and the company's streaming services (including Paramount+, Showtime OTT and Pluto TV). It also has a dedicated international division that manages international versions of its pay TV networks, as well as region-specific assets including Argentina's Telefe, Chile's Chilevisión, the United Kingdom's Channel 5 and Australia's Network 10. The division also owned a 30% stake in the Rainbow S.p.A. studio until 2023.

As of 2019, the company operates over 170 networks and reaches approximately 700 million subscribers in 180 countries.

Background 

Paramount Pictures, CBS, and Viacom each had a history of being associated with one another through a series of various corporate mergers and splits. Paramount Pictures was founded in 1912 as the Famous Players Film Company. CBS was founded in 1927, which Paramount Pictures held a 49 percent ownership stake in from 1929 to 1932. In 1952, CBS formed CBS Television Film Sales, a division which handled syndication rights for CBS's library of network owned television series. This division was renamed CBS Films in 1958, and again renamed CBS Enterprises Inc. in January 1968, and finally renamed Viacom (an acronym of Video and Audio Communications) in 1970. In 1971, this syndication division was spun off amid new FCC rules forbidding television networks from owning syndication companies (these rules were eventually abolished completely in 1993). In 1985, Viacom purchased MTV Networks and Showtime/The Movie Channel Inc. from Warner Communications and American Express. In 1986, Viacom was acquired by its present owner, theater operator company National Amusements.

Meanwhile, Paramount Pictures was acquired by Gulf and Western Industries in 1966, which then re-branded itself as Paramount Communications in 1989. Viacom then purchased Paramount Communications in 1994.

In 1999, Viacom made its biggest acquisition to date by announcing plans to merge with its former parent CBS Corporation (the renamed Westinghouse Electric Corporation, which had merged with CBS in 1995). The merger was completed in 2000, resulting in CBS reuniting with its former syndication division. On December 31, 2005, Viacom was split into two companies: CBS Corporation, the former's corporate successor and the spun-off Viacom company.

History

Formation 
On September 29, 2016, National Amusements, the parent company of CBS Corporation and Viacom, wrote to Viacom and CBS encouraging the two companies to merge back into one company. On December 12, the deal was called off.

On January 12, 2018, CNBC reported that Viacom had re-entered talks to merge back into CBS Corporation, after the merger of AT&T-Time Warner and Disney's proposed acquisition of most of 21st Century Fox's assets were announced. Viacom and CBS also faced heavy competition from companies such as Netflix and Amazon. Shortly afterward, it was reported that the combined company could be a suitor for acquiring the film studio Lionsgate. Viacom and Lionsgate were both interested in acquiring The Weinstein Company. Following the Weinstein effect, Viacom was listed as one of 22 potential buyers that were interested in acquiring TWC. They lost the bid, and on March 1, 2018, it was announced that Maria Contreras-Sweet would acquire all of TWC's assets for $500 million. Lantern Capital would later acquire the studio.

On March 30, 2018, CBS made an all-stock offer slightly below Viacom's market value, insisting that its existing leadership, including long-time chairman and CEO Les Moonves, oversee the re-combined company. Viacom rejected the offer as too low, requesting a $2.8  billion increase and that Bob Bakish be maintained as president and COO under Moonves. These conflicts had resulted from Shari Redstone seeking more control over CBS and its leadership.

Eventually, on May 14, 2018, CBS Corporation sued its and Viacom's parent company National Amusements and accused Redstone of abusing her voting power in the company and forcing a merger that was not supported by it or Viacom. CBS also accused Redstone of discouraging Verizon Communications from acquiring it, which could have been beneficial to its shareholders.

On May 23, 2018, Les Moonves explained that he considered the Viacom channels to be an "albatross," and while he favored more content for CBS All Access, he believed that there were better deals for CBS than the Viacom deal, such as Metro-Goldwyn-Mayer, Lionsgate, or Sony Pictures. Moonves also considered Bakish a threat because he did not want an ally of Shari Redstone as a board member of the combined company.

On September 9, 2018, Les Moonves exited CBS following multiple accusations of sexual assault. National Amusements agreed to not propose a CBS-Viacom merger for at least two years after the date of the settlement.

On May 30, 2019, CNBC reported that CBS Corporation and Viacom would explore merger discussions in mid-June 2019. CBS's board of directors was revamped with people who were open to merging; the re-merger was made possible with the resignation of Moonves, who had opposed all merger attempts. The talks had started following rumors of CBS acquiring Starz from Lionsgate. Reports said that CBS and Viacom reportedly set August 8 as an informal deadline for reaching an agreement to recombine the two media companies. CBS announced to acquire Viacom as part of the re-merger deal for up to $15.4 billion.

On August 2, 2019, it was reported that CBS and Viacom agreed to merge back into one entity, with both companies agreeing on the management team for the merger. Bob Bakish would serve as CEO of the combined company with the president and acting CEO of CBS, Joseph Ianniello, overseeing CBS-branded assets. On August 7, 2019, CBS and Viacom separately reported their quarterly earnings as the talks about the re-merger continued.

Initial operations 

On August 13, 2019, CBS and Viacom officially announced their merger; the combined company was to be named ViacomCBS, with Shari Redstone serving as chair. Upon the merger agreement, Viacom and CBS jointly announced that the transaction is expected to close by the end of 2019, pending regulatory and shareholder approvals. The merger required approval by the Federal Trade Commission.

On October 28, 2019, the merger was approved by National Amusements, which then announced the deal would close in early December; the recombined company trades its shares on Nasdaq under the symbols "VIAC" and "VIACA" after CBS Corporation delisted its shares on the New York Stock Exchange.

On November 25, 2019, Viacom and CBS announced the merger would close on December 4 and begin trading on NASDAQ on next day. On December 4, 2019, Bakish confirmed that the ViacomCBS merger had closed.

On December 10, 2019, days after the merger, Bakish announced that ViacomCBS would look to divest Black Rock, the building that held CBS's headquarters since 1964. He stated, "Black Rock is not an asset we need to own and we believe that money would be put to better use elsewhere." On December 20, 2019, ViacomCBS agreed to acquire a 49% minority stake in film studio Miramax from beIN Media Group for $379 million. As part of the purchase, Paramount Pictures reached a long-term deal for exclusive distribution rights to its library, and first-look agreements to co-develop new film and television projects based on Miramax-owned properties.

On March 2, 2020, executive vice president Dana McClintock announced that he would depart the company after 27 years in CBS Communications. On March 4, the company announced plans to potentially sell its Simon & Schuster publishing unit, with Bakish arguing that it lacked a "significant connection for our broader business."

On June 19, 2020, Jaime Ondarza, formerly the senior vice president of Turner Broadcasting South Europe and Africa, became the new head of ViacomCBS Networks International for France, Spain, Italy, the Middle East, Greece, and Turkey.

On August 4, 2020, ViacomCBS announced that the company's connected video advertising platform, EyeQ, is set to launch in fall 2020.

On September 14, 2020, ViacomCBS announced an agreement to sell the CBSi owned CNET Media Group to Red Ventures for $500 million. The deal included the eponymous CNET tech site, as well as ZDNet, GameSpot, the TV Guide digital assets, Metacritic, and Chowhound. The deal closed on October 30, 2020.

On November 17, 2020, various news outlets had reported that companies such as Vivendi, Bertelsmann's Penguin Random House and News Corp's HarperCollins had considered acquiring Simon & Schuster for as much as $1.7 billion. ViacomCBS had expected the bids to be placed before November 26. On November 25, 2020, Penguin Random House agreed to purchase Simon & Schuster for $2.175 billion; however, the deal was blocked two years later by U.S. federal judge Florence Y. Pan. On August 16, 2021, ViacomCBS announced that they had agreed to sell the CBS Building to the real estate investment and management firm Harbor Group International for $760 million, leasing the space back under a short-term lease. On September 28, 2021, ViacomCBS announced that they had agreed to partner with software and data firm VideoAmp. On October 28, 2021, ViacomCBS announced that they had agreed to acquire a majority stake in the Spanish-language content producer TeleColombia & Estudios TeleMexico. On November 30, 2021, ViacomCBS announced that they had agreed to sell the CBS Studio Center to Hackman Capital Partners and Square Mile Capital Management for $1.85 billion.

On January 5, 2022, The Wall Street Journal reported that WarnerMedia and ViacomCBS were exploring a possible sale of either a majority stake or all of The CW, and that Nexstar Media Group (which became The CW's largest affiliate group when it acquired former WB co-owner Tribune Broadcasting in 2019) was considered a leading bidder. The news led to speculation that, should a sale take place, new ownership could steer the network in a new direction, transforming The CW from a young adult-oriented network into one that featured more unscripted and even national news programming. However, reports also indicated that WarnerMedia and ViacomCBS could include a contractual commitment that would require any new owner to buy new programming from those companies, allowing them to reap some continual revenue through the network. Network president/CEO Mark Pedowitz confirmed talks of a potential sale in a memo to CW staffers, but added that "It's too early to speculate what might happen" and that the network "must continue to do what we do best."

Rebranding 

On February 15, 2022, during a presentation to investors, ViacomCBS announced that it would change its name to Paramount Global (effectively retiring the Viacom name after 52 years dating back to the original company founded in 1970) beginning the following day; in a memo to staff announcing the change, it was stated that the rebranding was intended to leverage the "iconic global name", and would "reflect who we are, what we aspire to be, and all that we stand for." The company will primarily do business as simply "Paramount". In May 2022, Berkshire Hathaway had acquired a $2.6 billion stake in Paramount.

On August 15, Nexstar confirmed it had "entered into a definitive agreement" to acquire a 75% majority share in The CW; the remaining 25% would be shared equally by Paramount Global and Warner Bros. Discovery (the latter resulting from Discovery's acquisition of WarnerMedia from AT&T). Additionally, Nexstar indicated that Mark Pedowitz would remain the network's chairman and CEO and have "responsibility for day-to-day operations. Though no monetary terms were announced, Nexstar reportedly would not pay any cash or stock up front, and would absorb approximately $100 million of network debt. As the sale does not entail the transfer of any FCC broadcast licenses (unlike the "Big Four" networks, The CW does not directly own any of its affiliates), no regulatory approvals are required, only customary financial closing conditions expected to be cleared in Nexstar's fiscal third quarter, i.e. by the start of October 2022; as such, Nexstar immediately took operational control of the network on August 15. On October 3, it was officially announced Nexstar closed the deal to acquire the majority ownership of The CW, and that longtime CEO Mark Pedowitz would be stepping down, planning to revive his production company Pine Street Entertainment. Dennis Miller would take Pedowitz's role as president of The CW.

Company units 

Paramount Global comprises six major units:
 Paramount Pictures as the company's namesake division focuses on theatrical film production and distribution, including film releases under the Paramount Animation and Paramount Players labels in addition to the flagship Paramount Pictures label, as well as producing television shows through Paramount Television Studios.
 Paramount Media Networks encompasses the pay television channels owned by Paramount in the United States such as MTV, Nickelodeon, Showtime, Comedy Central, TV Land, Paramount Network, Logo, CMT, Pop TV, Smithsonian Channel, The Movie Channel and Flix, as well as controlling its production facilities for the listed channels above, including Nickelodeon Animation Studio and MTV Entertainment Studios.
 Paramount International Networks encompasses certain international versions of their television channels split into three regional hubs: United Kingdom and Australia, Europe, Middle East, Africa and Asia (EMEAA), and the Americas, as well as region-specific networks (such as Channel 5 in the United Kingdom, Network 10 in Australia, Telefe in Argentina and Chilevisión in Chile), owning other businesses in a percentage stake (such as 30% of the Rainbow S.p.A. television studio in Italy and 49% of the Viacom 18 which joint venture with TV18), and all CBS-branded channels across Europe which are co-owned with AMC Networks International.
 Paramount Digital Studios consists of digital online and video internet properties including Awesomeness (a media and entertainment company where is overseen by its co-founder Brian Robbins, also an executive for Paramount Media Networks, as of November 2019).
 Paramount Streaming focuses on the global over-the-top streaming services that encompasses Paramount+, Pluto TV, Showtime, SkyShowtime (50% with Comcast (through Sky Group)), CBS News, CBS Sports HQ, BET+ and Noggin.
 Paramount Global Content Distribution focuses on the global distribution and licensing of programs all produced by Paramount production studios.
 Paramount Consumer Products focuses on the retailing and licensing of merchandising for the Paramount-owned brands.
 CBS Entertainment Group consists of CBS-branded assets including the CBS television network, CBS News and Stations, CBS Sports, CBS Studios, CBS Media Ventures, and Big Ticket Television. It also has a 12.5% ownership in The CW television network. In addition, the group consists of BET Networks, which contains premium cable television channels including the flagship service BET and VH1.

Other assets owned by Paramount include Simon & Schuster (book publisher), VidCon (multi-genre online video conference) and Bellator (mixed martial arts promoter). The company also has an undisclosed stake in FuboTV, which acquired in 2020.

Notes

References

External links 

 

 
2019 establishments in New York City
American companies established in 2019
Entertainment companies based in New York City
Entertainment companies established in 2019
Companies based in Manhattan
Companies based in New York City
Companies listed on the Nasdaq
Mass media companies based in New York City
Mass media companies established in 2019
Multinational companies based in New York City
Publicly traded companies based in New York City